Liburniella is a genus of delphacid planthoppers in the family Delphacidae. There is at least one described species in Liburniella, L. ornata.

References

Further reading

External links

 

Articles created by Qbugbot
Auchenorrhyncha genera
Delphacinae